Maxine Fensom (born 30 August 1958) is an Australian entrepreneur well known in the adult industry for founding a number of strip clubs, strippers’ agencies, themed events and adult online stores. She also is the owner, and the founder and established the annual Australian Adult Industry Awards in 2000 to recognise achievements in the Australian adult industry as well as being the founder and owner of the national Miss Erotica and Miss Dream Girl pageants. Maxine recently acquired the licensing rights to Sexpo to hold the first ever exhibition in the United States launching in April 2023.

Early life and education 
Fensom was born on 30 August 1958 in Brisbane, Australia. Moving to Melbourne at the age of two, Fensom was educated at Camberwell High School and Brinsley Road Free School in Camberwell and had a modest upbringing, the only child of a single mother. She trained as a psychiatric nurse at Swinburne Technical College, but eventually her passion for dancing and acting led her to setting up a promotional dance troupe, which performed around Melbourne successfully for a number of years. Fensom also acted on television, appearing in various episodes as "Bouncy Miss" in the acclaimed Australian Broadcasting Corporation miniseries The Damnation of Harvey McHugh. She has also had a biography written about her life as the most recognisable female face in the adult industry.

Career 

Fensom currently operates a gentlemen's club in the suburb of Brunswick in Melbourne. Other businesses she operates include event agencies, a topless bar, an adult merchandise online store, a concierge service and adult party services.

Her career in the adult industry began as after her three-year stint on the daily horoscope segment of Channel Nine's In Melbourne Today show ended. Hosting bucks parties and private functions, Fensom's business grew exponentially, taking on corporate customers and establishing a business headquarters with the support of high-profile porn publisher Larry Flynt and Harry Mohney. Fensom has also been featured in Australian Playboy as a playmate of the month, in their "Girls from Melbourne" edition.

As a prominent female face in the male-dominated adult industry, Fensom has had her fair share of challenges, including social media bullying. Fensom is a strong supporter of female empowerment and helping women exit the adult industry, more regulations around employment in the adult industry and increased sentences for perpetrators of violent crime against women; running as an independent candidate in Victorian state elections in 2002 and 2010. Currently residing in Las Vegas, Fensom is also the CEO of the Sin City Chamber of Commerce as well as the Las Vegas Cannabis Chamber of Commerce; where she also is an ordained minister regularly performing marriages for discerning couples.

The rapid success and acclaimed reviews of Fensom's cannabis sightseeing tours (Las Vegas Cannabis Tours) have also gained her recent recognition by The New York Times. as well as Forbes

In April 2023 Maxine will be launching the first United States Sexpo to be held in Las Vegas, Nevada
 
Fensom is also the proud mother of her beloved five-year-old rescue chihuahua, Chloe Rose.

International ventures 
Expanding her brand and signature style internationally, Fensom has launched a number of ventures in the Las Vegas market, most notably Las Vegas Cannabis Tours - Sin City's first and best sightseeing company for cannabis enthusiasts.

To expand on the success of these tours, she has brought her passion for creating unique and memorable experiences to her signature Sin City Foodie Tours and Vegas Baby Weddings. A connoisseur for service excellence, Fensom is also an ordained minister who enjoys officiating all her company's wedding ceremonies personally.

Always seeking new adventures, Fensom has also brought her charm and style to the fashion industry with her bespoke Tinsel Glamour label, developed in collaboration with globally renowned Australian artist Madbutt.

Fensom has also recently created Elevate Jayne, an online curated 420 retail experience of all things inspired by cannabis, including fashion, her tinsel glamour range, homeware, smoking accessories, and more.

References

Further reading
  Las Vegas Cannabis Tours | https://www.nytimes.com/2021/07/13/travel/legal-weed-travel.html | New York Times, July 13, 2021
 
 

Living people
Australian businesspeople
1958 births